The protected areas of Nicaragua are areas that have natural beauty or significance and are protected by Nicaragua. Nicaragua has 78 protected areas that cover 22,422 km2, about 17.3% of the nations landmass. The National System of Protected Areas (SINAP) is administered by the Ministry of the Environment and Natural Resources (MARENA).

History
The Peninsula of Cosigüina Wildlife Refuge was established in 1958 and was the first protected area in Nicaragua. Two more protected areas were established in 1979 and there was a total of 25 by 1990. Prior to 1979, the Central Bank of Nicaragua was assigned responsibility for the two national parks and one natural reserve created during the Somoza regime.

In March 1999, a new law established regulations for private reserves in Nicaragua. Private wildlife reserves are defined as private areas dedicated to conservation by their landowners and recognized by MARENA, on the basis of certain criteria and the potential for the conservations of biodiversity.

List of protected areas

This is a complete list of protected areas in Nicaragua:

Alamikamaba Natural Reserve
Apacunca Genetic Reserve
Apoyo Lagoon Natural Reserve
Asososca Lagoon Natural Reserve
Bismuna Raya Lagoon Natural Reserve
Bosawás Biosphere Reserve
Cabo Viejo-Tala-Sulamas Natural Reserve
Cayos Miskitos Biological Reserve
Cerro Apante Nature Reserve
Cerro Arenal Natural Reserve
Cerro Banacruz Natural Reserve
Cerro Cola Blanca Natural Reserve
Cerro Cumaica–Cerro Alegre Nature Reserve
Cerro Guabule Nature Reserve
Cerro Kilambé Natural Reserve
Cerro Mombachito - La Vieja Natural Reserve
Cerro Musún Natural Reserve
Cerro Pancasan Natural Reserve
Cerro Quiabuc–Las Brisas Nature Reserve
Cerro Silva Natural Reserve
Cerro Tisey–Estanzuela Nature Reserve
Cerro Wawashang Natural Reserve
Chacocente Wildlife Refuge
Chiltepe Peninsula Natural Reserve
Chocoyero-El Brujo Natural Reserve
Cordillera de Yolaina Natural Reserve
Cordillera Dipilto and Jalapa Natural Reserve
Cosigüina Volcano Natural Reserve
El Arenal Natural Reserve
Estero Padre Ramos Natural Reserve
Estero Real Natural Reserve
Fila Masigüe Natural Reserve
Hurricane Mitch Victims National Monument
Indio Maíz Biological Reserve
Juan Venado Island Natural Reserve
Kligna Natural Reserve
Kukalaya Lagoon Natural Reserve
La Inmaculada Fort Historical Site
La Máquina Natural Reserve
Layasika Lagoon Natural Reserve
Limbaika Natural Reserve
Llanos de Apacunca Genetic Reserve
Llanos de Karawala Natural Reserve
Llanos de Makantaka Natural Reserve
Los Guatuzos Wildlife Refuge
Macizos de Peñas Blancas Natural Reserve
Maderas Volcano Natural Reserve
Makantaka Natural Reserve
Masaya Volcano National Park
Mecatepe Lagoon Natural Reserve
Mesas de Moropotente Natural Reserve
Miraflor Natural Reserve
Mombacho Volcano Natural Reserve
O Parks, WildLife, and Recreation, formerly named Ostional Private WildLife Reserve
Nejapa Lagoon Natural Reserve
Pahara Lagoon Natural Reserve
Punta Gorda Natural Reserve
Río Manares Natural Reserve
Río San Juan Wildlife Refugee
Salto Río Yasika Natural Reserve
Selva Negra Cloud Forest Reserve
Sierra Amerrisque Nature Reserve
Sierra Quirragua Natural Reserve
Solentiname National Monument
Somoto Canyon National Monument
Tepesomoto–Pataste Nature Reserve
Tiscapa Lagoon Natural Reserve
Tisma Lagoon Natural Reserve
Volcán Maderas Natural Reserve
Volcán Pilas El Hoyo Natural Reserve
Volcán San Cristóbal Natural Reserve
Volcán San Cristóbal-Casita Natural Reserve
Volcán Telica Rota Natural Reserve
Volcán Yali Natural Reserve
Yolaina Natural Reserve
Yucul Genetic Reserve
Yulu Karata Natural Reserve
Yulu Natural Reserve
Zapatera Archipelago National Park

See also

National System of Protected Areas (Nicaragua)
Tourism in Nicaragua
Wildlife of Nicaragua

References

External links

MARENA - government website
Eco-tourism in Nicaragua (The Guardian)